Peripleura is a genus of flowering plants in the family Asteraceae.

References

Astereae
Asteraceae genera